In the Gloaming may refer to:
"In the Gloaming" (song), 1877 British song
In the Gloaming (film), 1997 American TV film based on a story by Alice Elliott Dark
In the Gloaming, 1998 album by Jolene

See also
Roamin' in the Gloamin', 1911 song
Homer in the Gloamin', 1938 baseball play
Gloaming (disambiguation)